Qianwan station is an interchange station for Line 5 and Line 9 of the Shenzhen Metro. It opened on 28 September 2019 with Line 5, whilst Line 9 opened on 8 December 2019.

Station layout

Exits

References

External links
 Shenzhen Metro Qianwan station (Chinese)
 Shenzhen Metro Qianwan station (English)

Shenzhen Metro stations
Railway stations in Guangdong
Nanshan District, Shenzhen
Railway stations in China opened in 2019